Mực rang muối is a dish in Vietnamese cuisine.

References

External links
TRAN CAN COOK!: How to make Muc Rang Muoi (Salt Toasted Squid) YouTube

Squid dishes
Vietnamese cuisine